East Malaita is a single-member constituency of the National Parliament of Solomon Islands. Located on the island of Malaita, it was established in 1973 when the Governing Council was expanded from 17 to 24 seats. It was abolished in 1993 when Parliament was expanded from 38 to 47 seats, but re-established in 1997 when a further three seats were added. Alfred Maetia, who served as MP for East Malaita between 1980 and 1993, was elected in Central Kwara'ae in the 1993 elections, but returned to contest the East Malaita seat in 1997.

List of MPs

Election results

2019

2014

2010

2008

2006

2001

1997

1989

1984

1980

1976

1973

References

Governing Council of the Solomon Islands constituencies
Legislative Assembly of the Solomon Islands constituencies
Solomon Islands parliamentary constituencies
1973 establishments in the Solomon Islands
Constituencies established in 1973
1993 disestablishments in the Solomon Islands
Constituencies disestablished in 1993
1997 establishments in the Solomon Islands
Constituencies established in 1997